Allari Bullodu is a 2005 Indian Telugu-language action comedy film stars Nithiin, Trisha and Rathi. The film is directed by K. Raghavendra Rao. The score and soundtrack was composed by M. M. Keeravani , three songs directed by Shiva Rama Krishna, was released in September 2005 and it was an average grosser at the box office. The film was later dubbed into Hindi as Mawali: Ek Play Boy in 2009.

Plot 
Madhava Rao is a big businessman and his competitor Saxena is a crook. When Madhav Rao meets with an accident, his daughter Trisha takes over the company. Raju comes from nowhere to help Trisha. Trisha appoints Raju as general manager. Trisha has an inseparable younger sister called Usha. Due to certain circumstances, Raju forces himself to disguise as Balu and Usha falls in love with Balu. As the confusion about mixed identities continue, Munna - another lookalike of Raju - comes from Mumbai. Munna is a right hand of Karim Lala - a Mumbai underworld don. The rest of the story is all about what happens when Munna try to destroy the family which Raju intend to save.

Cast

Nithiin as Raju a.k.a. Balu / Munna [Double Role]
Trisha as Trisha
Rathi as Usha
Sunil as Babji
Saurabh Shukla as Karim Lala
Telangana Shakuntala as Nellore Naiduamma
Brahmanandam as Nellore Naiduamma's husband
Vizag Prasad as Madhava Rao (Trisha's father) 
Satya Prakash as Saxena
Kota Srinivasa Rao
Ali
Krishna Bhagavan
Sudha
Jayalalitha
Tanikella Bharani as Raju's father
Venu Madhav
Dharmavarapu Subramanyam
Chitram Seenu
Vizag Prasad

Music 
The music and background score was composed by M. M. Keeravani.

 "Andamantee Evaridhi" - SPB. Charan, Sunitha
 "Noppi Noppi Emi Noppi" - Udit Narayan, Shreya Ghoshal
 "Dashukunte Dhanadhan" - Devi Sri Prasad, Chitra
 "Trisha Achata Ichata" - M. M. Keeravani, Chitra
 "Mogavada Mathi Poyara" - Tippu, Shweta Pandit
 "Ataka Meeda Undhamo" - Jassie Gift, Sunidhi Chauhan

Reception
The Hindu noted that "The film looks cinematic with no logic and only the saving grace is performances by Nitin and Trisha".

References

External links
 

2005 films
Films scored by M. M. Keeravani
2000s Telugu-language films
Films directed by K. Raghavendra Rao
Indian romantic comedy films